The icosian game is a mathematical game invented in 1857 by William Rowan Hamilton. The game's object is finding a Hamiltonian cycle along the edges of a dodecahedron such that every vertex is visited a single time, and the ending point is the same as the starting point. The puzzle was distributed commercially as a pegboard with holes at the nodes of the dodecahedral graph and was subsequently marketed in Europe in many forms.

The motivation for Hamilton was the problem of symmetries of an icosahedron, for which he invented icosian calculus—an algebraic tool to compute the symmetries. The solution of the puzzle is a cycle containing twenty (in ancient Greek icosa) edges (i.e. a Hamiltonian circuit on the dodecahedron).

See also 
 Hunt the Wumpus
 Dual polyhedron
 Seven Bridges of Königsberg

References

External links 
 
 Puzzle Museum article with pictures

Mathematical games
Graph theory
Hamiltonian paths and cycles
William Rowan Hamilton